T-Bone Burnett Presents The Speaking Clock Revue: Live from the Beacon Theatre is a 2011 live album featuring various musicians such as Elton John, Leon Russell, John Mellencamp, Elvis Costello, Gregg Allman, Ralph Stanley, Jeff Bridges and T Bone Burnett.

References

2011 live albums
T Bone Burnett albums
Albums produced by T Bone Burnett